Yves Narduzzi (born 1969) is a French slalom canoeist who competed from the mid-1980s to the late 1990s. He won a silver medal in the C1 team event at the 1997 ICF Canoe Slalom World Championships in Três Coroas.

World Cup individual podiums

References

French male canoeists
Living people
1969 births
Medalists at the ICF Canoe Slalom World Championships